The Canadian dollar (symbol: $; code: CAD) is the currency of Canada. It is abbreviated with the dollar sign $. There is no standard disambiguating form, but the abbreviations Can$ and C$ are frequently used for distinction from other dollar-denominated currencies (though C$ remains ambiguous with the Nicaraguan córdoba). It is divided into 100 cents (¢).

Owing to the image of a common loon on its reverse, the dollar coin, and sometimes the unit of currency itself, may be referred to as the loonie by English-speaking Canadians and foreign exchange traders and analysts.

Accounting for approximately 2% of all global reserves, the Canadian dollar is the fifth-most held reserve currency in the world, behind the U.S. dollar, the euro, the yen and sterling. The Canadian dollar is popular with central banks because of Canada's relative economic soundness, the Canadian government's strong sovereign position, and the stability of the country's legal and political systems.

History

Colonial currencies
The 1850s in Canada were a decade of debate over whether to adopt a £sd-based monetary system or a decimal monetary system based on the US dollar. The British North American provinces, for reasons of practicality in relation to the increasing trade with the neighbouring United States, had a desire to assimilate their currencies with the American unit, but the imperial authorities in London still preferred sterling as the sole currency throughout the British Empire. The British North American provinces nonetheless gradually adopted currencies tied to the American dollar.

Province of Canada
In 1841, the Province of Canada adopted a new system based on the Halifax rating. The new Canadian pound was equal to four US dollars (92.88 grains gold), making £1 sterling equal to £1.4s.4d. Canadian. Thus, the new Canadian pound was worth 16 shillings and 5.3 pence sterling.

In 1851, the Parliament of the Province of Canada passed an act for the purposes of introducing a sterling-based unit in conjunction with decimal fractional coinage. The idea was that the decimal coins would correspond to exact amounts in relation to the U.S. dollar fractional coinage.

In response to British concerns, in 1853, an act of the Parliament of the Province of Canada introduced the gold standard into the colony, based on both the British gold sovereign and the American gold eagle coins. This gold standard was introduced with the gold sovereign being legal tender at £1 = US$. No coinage was provided for under the 1853 act. Sterling coinage was made legal tender and all other silver coins were demonetized. The British government in principle allowed for a decimal coinage but nevertheless held out the hope that a sterling unit would be chosen under the name of "royal". However, in 1857, the decision was made to introduce a decimal coinage into the Province of Canada in conjunction with the U.S. dollar unit. Hence, when the new decimal coins were introduced in 1858, the colony's currency became aligned with the U.S. currency, although the British gold sovereign continued to remain legal tender at the rate of £1 = Can$ right up until the 1990s. In 1859, Canadian colonial postage stamps were issued with decimal denominations for the first time. In 1861, Canadian postage stamps were issued with the denominations shown in dollars and cents.

Maritime colonies
In 1860, the colonies of New Brunswick and Nova Scotia followed the Province of Canada in adopting a decimal system based on the U.S. dollar unit.

In 1871, Prince Edward Island went decimal within the U.S. dollar unit and introduced coins in the denomination of 1 cent. However, the currency of Prince Edward Island was absorbed into the Canadian system shortly afterwards, when Prince Edward Island joined the Dominion of Canada in 1873.

Newfoundland
Newfoundland went decimal in 1865, but unlike the Province of Canada, New Brunswick, and Nova Scotia, it decided to adopt a unit based on the Spanish dollar rather than on the U.S. dollar, and there was a slight difference between these two units. The U.S. dollar was created in 1792 on the basis of the average weight of a selection of worn Spanish dollars. As such, the Spanish dollar was worth slightly more than the U.S. dollar, and likewise, the Newfoundland dollar, until 1895, was worth slightly more than the Canadian dollar.

British Columbia
The Colony of British Columbia adopted the British Columbia dollar as its currency in 1865, at par with the Canadian dollar. When British Columbia joined Canada as its sixth province in 1871, the Canadian dollar replaced the British Columbia dollar.

Post-Confederation history
In 1867, the Province of Canada, New Brunswick, and Nova Scotia united into a federation named Canada. As a result, their respective currencies were merged into a singular Canadian dollar. The Canadian Parliament passed the Uniform Currency Act in April 1871, tying up loose ends as to the currencies of the various provinces and replacing them with a common Canadian dollar.

The gold standard was temporarily abandoned during the First World War and definitively abolished on April 10, 1933. At the outbreak of the Second World War, the exchange rate to the U.S. dollar was fixed at Can$1.10 = US$1.00. This was changed to parity in 1946. In 1949, sterling was devalued and Canada followed, returning to a peg of Can$1.10 = US$1.00. However, Canada allowed its dollar to float in 1950, whereupon the currency rose to a slight premium over the U.S. dollar for the next decade. But the Canadian dollar fell sharply after 1960 before it was again pegged in 1962 at Can$1.00 = US$0.925. This was sometimes pejoratively referred to as the "Diefenbuck" or the "Diefendollar", after the then Prime Minister, John Diefenbaker. This peg lasted until 1970, with the currency's value being floated since then.

Terminology

Canadian English, similar to American English, used the slang term "buck" for a former paper dollar. The Canadian origin of this term derives from a coin struck by the Hudson's Bay Company during the 17th century with a value equal to the pelt of a male beaver – a "buck". Because of the appearance of the common loon on the back of the $1 coin that replaced the dollar bill in 1987, the word loonie was adopted in Canadian parlance to distinguish the Canadian dollar coin from the dollar bill. When the two-dollar coin was introduced in 1996, the derivative word toonie ("two loonies") became the common word for it in Canadian English slang.

After the British conquest of Canada in 1760, French coins gradually went out of use, and  became a nickname for the halfpenny, which was similar in value to the French sou. Spanish dollars and U.S. dollars were also in use, and from 1841 to 1858, the exchange rate was fixed at $4 = £1  (or 400¢ = 240d). This made 25¢ equal to 15d, or 30 halfpence. After decimalization and the withdrawal of halfpenny coins, the nickname  began to be used for the 1¢ coin, but the idiom  for 25¢ endured.

Coins

Coins are produced by the Royal Canadian Mint's facilities in Winnipeg, Manitoba, and Ottawa, Ontario, in denominations of 5¢ (nickel), 10¢ (dime), 25¢ (quarter), 50¢ (50¢ piece) (though the 50¢ piece is no longer distributed to banks and is only available directly from the mint, therefore seeing very little circulation), $1 (loonie), and $2 (toonie). The last 1¢ coin (penny) to be minted in Canada was struck on May 4, 2012, and distribution of the penny ceased on February 4, 2013. Ever since, the price for a cash transaction is rounded to the nearest five cents. The penny continues to be legal tender, although they are only accepted as payment and not given back as change.

The standard set of designs has Canadian symbols, usually wildlife, on the reverse, and an effigy of Elizabeth II on the obverse. Some pennies, nickels, and dimes remain in circulation that bear the effigy of George VI. It is also common for American coins to be found among circulation due to the close proximity to the United States and the fact that the sizes of the coins are similar. Commemorative coins with differing reverses are also issued on an irregular basis, most often quarters. 50¢ coins are rarely found in circulation; they are often collected and not regularly used in day-to-day transactions in most provinces.

Coin history

In 1858, bronze 1¢ and 0.925 silver 5¢, 10¢ and 20¢ coins were issued by the Province of Canada. Except for 1¢ coins struck in 1859, no more coins were issued until 1870, when production of the 5¢ and 10¢ was resumed and silver 25¢ and 50¢ were introduced. Between 1908 and 1919, sovereigns (legal tender in Canada for $) were struck in Ottawa with a "C" mintmark.

Canada produced its first gold dollar coins in 1912 in the form of $5 and $10. These coins were produced from 1912 to 1914. The obverse carries an image of King George V and on the reverse is a shield with the arms of the Dominion of Canada. Gold from the Klondike River valley in the Yukon accounts for much of the gold in the coins.

Two years into the coin's production World War I began and production of the coins stopped in favour of tighter control over Canadian gold reserves. Most of the 1914 coins produced never reached circulation at the time and some were stored for more than 75 years until being sold off in 2012. The high quality specimens were sold to the public and the visually unappealing ones were melted.

In 1920, the size of the 1¢ was reduced and the silver fineness of the 5¢, 10¢, 25¢ and 50¢ coins was reduced to 0.800 silver/.200 copper. This composition was maintained for the 10¢, 25¢ and 50¢ piece through 1966, but the debasement of the 5¢ piece continued in 1922 with the silver 5¢ being entirely replaced by a larger nickel coin. In 1942, as a wartime measure, nickel was replaced by tombac in the 5¢ coin, which was changed in shape from round to dodecagonal. Chromium-plated steel was used for the 5¢ in 1944 and 1945 and between 1951 and 1954, after which nickel was readopted. The 5¢ returned to a round shape in 1963.

In 1935, the 0.800 silver voyageur dollar was introduced. Production was maintained through 1967 with the exception of the war years between 1939 and 1945.

In 1967 both 0.800 silver/0.200 copper and, later that year, 0.500 silver/.500 copper 10¢ and 25¢ coins were issued. 1968 saw further debasement: the 0.500 fine silver dimes and quarters were completely replaced by nickel ones mid-year. All 1968 50¢ and $1 coins were reduced in size and coined only in pure nickel. Thus, 1968 marked the last year in which any circulating silver coinage was issued in Canada.

In 1982, the 1¢ coin was changed to dodecagonal, and the 5¢ was further debased to a cupro-nickel alloy. In 1987 a $1 coin struck in aureate-plated nickel was introduced. A bimetallic $2 coin followed in 1996. In 1997, copper-plated zinc replaced bronze in the 1¢, and it returned to a round shape. This was followed, in 2000, by the introduction of even cheaper plated-steel 1¢, 5¢, 10¢, 25¢ and 50¢ coins, with the 1¢ plated in copper and the others plated in cupro-nickel. In 2012, the multi-ply plated-steel technology was introduced for $1 and $2 coins as well. Also in that year mintage of the 1¢ coin ceased and its withdrawal from circulation began in 2013.

Banknotes

The first paper money issued in Canada denominated in dollars were British Army bills, issued between 1813 and 1815. Canadian dollar banknotes were later issued by the chartered banks starting in the 1830s, by several pre-Confederation colonial governments (most notably the Province of Canada in 1866), and after confederation, by the Canadian government starting in 1870. Some municipalities also issued notes, most notably depression scrip during the 1930s.

On July 3, 1934, with only 10 chartered banks still issuing notes, the Bank of Canada was founded. This new government agency became the sole issuer of all federal notes. In 1935, it issued its first series of notes in denominations of $1, $2, $5, $10, $20, $25, $50, $100, $500 and $1000. The $25 note was a commemorative issue, released to mark the Silver Jubilee of King George V. In 1944, the chartered banks were prohibited from issuing their own currency, with the Royal Bank of Canada and the Bank of Montreal among the last to issue notes.

Significant design changes to the notes have occurred since 1935, with new series introduced in 1937, 1954, 1970, 1986, and 2001. In June 2011, newly designed notes printed on a polymer substrate, as opposed to cotton fibre, were announced; the first of these polymer notes, the $100 bill, began circulation on November 14, 2011, the $50 bill began circulation on March 26, 2012, the $20 denomination began circulation on November 7, 2012, and the $5 and $10 denominations began circulation on November 12, 2013.

Since 1935, all banknotes are printed by the Ottawa-based Canadian Bank Note Company under contract to the Bank of Canada. Previously, a second company, BA International (founded in 1866 as the British American Bank Note Company), shared printing duties. In 2011, BA International announced it would close its banknote printing business and cease printing banknotes at the end of 2012; since then, the Canadian Bank Note Company has been the sole printer of Canadian banknotes.

All banknotes from series prior to the current polymer series are now considered unfit for circulation due to their lacking of any modern security features, such as a metallic stripe. Financial institutions must return the banknotes to the Bank of Canada, which will then destroy them. Individuals may keep the banknotes indefinitely.

Legal tender
As of January 1, 2021, the $1, $2, $25, $500 and $1000 notes issued by the Bank of Canada are no longer legal tender. All other current and prior Canadian dollar banknotes issued by the Bank of Canada remain as legal tender in Canada. However, commercial transactions may legally be settled in any manner agreed by the parties involved.

Legal tender of Canadian coinage is governed by the Currency Act, which sets out limits of:
 $40 if the denomination is $2 or greater but does not exceed $10;
 $25 if the denomination is $1;
 $10 if the denomination is 10¢ or greater but less than $1;
 $5 if the denomination is 5¢;
 25¢ if the denomination is 1¢.

Retailers in Canada may refuse bank notes without breaking the law. According to legal guidelines, the method of payment has to be mutually agreed upon by the parties involved with the transactions. For example, stores may refuse $100 banknotes if they feel that would put them at risk of being counterfeit victims; however, official policy suggests that the retailers should evaluate the impact of that approach. In the case that no mutually acceptable form of payment can be found for the tender, the parties involved should seek legal advice.

Canadian dollars, especially coins, are accepted by some businesses in the northernmost cities of the United States and in many Canadian snowbird enclaves, just as U.S. dollars are accepted by some Canadian businesses.

In 2012, Iceland considered adopting the Canadian dollar as a stable alternative to the Icelandic króna.
Canada was favoured due to its northern geography and similar resource-based economy, in addition to its relative economic stability. The Canadian ambassador to Iceland said that Iceland could adopt the currency; although Iceland ultimately decided not to move on with the proposal.

Value

Since 76.7% of Canada's exports go to the U.S., and 53.3% of imports into Canada come from the U.S., Canadians are interested in the value of their currency mainly against the U.S. dollar. Although domestic concerns arise when the dollar trades much lower than its U.S. counterpart, there is also concern among exporters when the dollar appreciates quickly. A rise in the value of the dollar increases the price of Canadian exports to the U.S. On the other hand, there are advantages to a rising dollar, in that it is cheaper for Canadian industries to purchase foreign material and businesses.

The Bank of Canada currently has no specific target value for the Canadian dollar and has not intervened in foreign exchange markets since 1998. The Bank's official position is that market conditions should determine the worth of the Canadian dollar, although it occasionally makes minor attempts to influence its value.

On world markets, the Canadian dollar historically tended to move in tandem with the U.S. dollar. An apparently rising Canadian dollar (against the U.S. dollar) was decreasing against other international currencies; however, during the rise of the Canadian dollar between 2002 and 2013, it gained value against the U.S. dollar as well as other international currencies. In recent years, dramatic fluctuations in the value of the Canadian dollar have tended to correlate with shifts in oil prices, reflecting the Canadian dollar's status as a petrocurrency owing to Canada's significant oil exports.

However, the Canadian dollar remained close to par or 1:1 versus the gold or silver US dollar of the time.

Unlike other currencies in the Bretton Woods system, whose values were fixed, the Canadian dollar was allowed to float from 1950 to 1962.

The Canadian dollar fell considerably after 1960, and this contributed to Prime Minister John Diefenbaker's defeat in the 1963 election.

As an inflation-fighting measure, the Canadian dollar was allowed to float in 1970. Its value appreciated and it was worth more than the U.S. dollar for part of the 1970s. The high point was on April 25, 1974, when it reached .

The Canadian dollar fell in value against its American counterpart during the technological boom of the 1990s that was centred in the United States, and was traded for as little as US$0.6179 on January 21, 2002, which was an all-time low. Since then, its value against all major currencies rose until 2013, due in part to high prices for commodities (especially oil) that Canada exports.

The Canadian dollar's value against the U.S. dollar rose sharply in 2007 because of the continued strength of the Canadian economy and the U.S. currency's weakness on world markets. During trading on September 20, 2007, it met the U.S. dollar at parity for the first time since November 25, 1976.

Inflation in the value of the Canadian dollar has been fairly low since the 1990s. In 2007 the Canadian dollar rebounded, soaring 23% in value.

On September 28, 2007, the Canadian dollar closed above the U.S. dollar for the first time in 30 years, at US$1.0052. On November 7, 2007, it hit US$1.1024 during trading, a modern-day high after China announced it would diversify its trillion foreign exchange reserve away from the U.S. dollar. By November 30, however, the Canadian dollar was once again at par with the U.S. dollar, and on December 4, the dollar had retreated back to US$0.98, through a cut in interest rates made by the Bank of Canada due to concerns about exports to the U.S.

Due to its soaring value and new record highs at the time, the Canadian dollar was named the Canadian Newsmaker of the Year for 2007 by the Canadian edition of Time magazine.

Since the late 2000s, the Canadian dollar has been valued at levels comparable to the years before its swift rise in 2007. For most of the 2010s, the exchange rate of Canadian to US dollars was approximately US$0.70 to Can$1.00.

Reserve currency

A number of central banks (and commercial banks) keep Canadian dollars as a reserve currency. The Canadian dollar is considered to be a benchmark currency.

In the economy of the Americas, the Canadian dollar plays a similar role to that of the Australian dollar (AUD) in the Asia-Pacific region. The Canadian dollar (as a regional reserve currency for banking) has been an important part of the British, French and Dutch Caribbean states' economies and finance systems since the 1950s. The Canadian dollar is held by many central banks in Central and South America as well.

By observing how the Canadian dollar behaves against the U.S. dollar, foreign exchange economists can indirectly observe internal behaviours and patterns in the U.S. economy that could not be seen by direct observation. The Canadian dollar has fully evolved into a global reserve currency only since the 1970s, when it was floated against all other world currencies. Some economists have attributed the rise of importance of the Canadian dollar to the long-term effects of the Nixon Shock that effectively ended the Bretton Woods system of global finance.

Exchange rates

See also
 Economy of Canada
 List of countries by leading trade partners
 List of the largest trading partners of Canada

Notes

References

Citations

Sources

External links 

 
 Royal Canadian Mint
 Canadian Paper Money - historical banknotes 
 re:politics: The Canadian Dollar
 Bank of CanadaExchange rate lookup
 Bank of Canada — Bank notes

1858 in Canada
1858 introductions
Currencies of Canada
Currencies of the British Empire
Currencies of the Commonwealth of Nations
Currencies with multiple banknote issuers
Currency symbols